Ask Me to Dance may refer to:

Ask Me to Dance (Minnie Driver album), 2014
Ask Me to Dance (Cristy Lane album), 1980
"Ask Me to Dance", a 1962 song by Jane Morgan